William Henry Sykes publishes his catalogues of birds and mammals of the Deccan in the Proceedings of the Zoological Society of London. This included fifty-six birds new to science, including the Indian pond heron.
Édouard Ménétries describes Sylvia mystacea now known as Menetries's warbler
René Primevère Lesson commences Illustrations de Zoologie (1832–35)
Johann Georg Wagler moves the northern bald ibis to a new genus  Geronticus (from the genus Upupa Carl Linnaeus, 1758)
Death of Georges Cuvier
Death of Karl Rudolphi
Death of Louis Dufresne
Charles Lucien Bonaparte commences Iconografia della Fauna Italica (1832–1841)
The Reverend John Bachman, who presented study skins and descriptions to his friend and collaborator John James Audubon, discovers Bachman's warbler.
Foundation of Muséum d'histoire naturelle de La Rochelle
George Loddiges describes the mountain avocetbill, the Tyrian metaltail and the buff-tailed coronet

Birding and ornithology by year
1832 in science